Sixteen of the nineteen Virginia incumbents were re-elected.

References

See also 
 List of United States representatives from Virginia
 United States House of Representatives elections, 1794 and 1795

1795
Virginia
United States House of Representatives